Chamak Damak is a Pakistani soap opera aired on Hum TV. It is produced by Momina Duraid under her production banner MD Productions. It features Sumaiyya Bukhsh and Agha Talal in lead roles who previously appeared  together in Soya Mera Naseeb, Raeed Muhammad Alam as antagonist while Farhan Ali Agha in a guest appearance.

Cast 
Sumaiyya Bukhsh as Rameen
Agha Talal as Humayun
Raeed Muhammad Alam as Faraz
Hira Soomro as Farah
Aiman Zaman as Rabia
Durdana Saeed as Humayun's mother (Adila)
Sarah Asim as Sidra
Amrah Qazi as Sumbal
Rushna Khan as Zubia
Junaid Akhtar as Kaashaan
Sudheer Waswani as Saad
Aisha Khan as Rameen's mother
Farhan Ally Agha as Rameen's father
Kinza Malik as Rameen's mother	
Mubasira Khanam as Jasma's mother
Majida Hameed as Faraz's mother (Jasma)
Tehmina Javeed as Anum

Plot 
Rameen is a simple and innocent girl. She belongs to a middle-class family. She is close to her father. Her father suffers from an uncurable illness and tells Rameen's mother about his wish of getting Rameen married to Faraz, his nephew and paternal first cousin of Rameen. Rameen's father dies a few days later after telling about his last wish to Rameen's mother. On the other hand Rameen is in love relationship with Humayun, who belongs to a rich family. When Humayun's mother comes to Rameen's home with Humayun's proposal for Rameen, she denies on the spot due to class difference and the last wish of Rameen's father. Rameen marries Faraz against her will.

References

External links 
 

Pakistani television soap operas
Hum TV original programming
2020 Pakistani television series debuts
Pakistani television series
MD Productions